Fodor's  is a publisher of English language travel and tourism information. Fodor's Travel and Fodors.com are divisions of Internet Brands.

History

Founder Eugene Fodor was a keen traveler, but felt that the guidebooks of his time were boring, uninspired collections of quickly outdated facts and figures. He decided to address these shortcomings and wrote a guide to Europe, On the Continent—The Entertaining Travel Annual, which was published in 1936 by Francis Aldor, Aldor Publications, London.

Going beyond the usual lists of hotels and attractions, the book was updated yearly and gave practical guidance, such as tipping advice, alongside information about the local people and culture. For example, in the introduction, Fodor wrote "Rome contains not only magnificent monuments, but also Italians."

The pioneering book was a success in England and the United States. Fodor's Modern Guides, Inc. was founded in 1949 in Paris, France and David McKay Company began publishing the books a year later. McKay was sold to Random House in 1986.

In 1996, Fodor's launched a travel-related website fodors.com, which was nominated for a Webby Award in 2004. Fodor's has published more than 440 guides (in 14 series) on over 300 destinations, and has more than 700 permanently placed researchers all over the world.

In 2016, Fodor's was acquired by Internet Brands, which is based in El Segundo, California.

References

External links
 Fodors.com, official site

Travel guide books
Publishing companies of the United States
Random House
Publishing companies established in 1949